is a railway station in Iwakuni, Yamaguchi Prefecture, Japan, operated by West Japan Railway Company (JR West).

Lines
Yū Station is served by the Sanyō Main Line.

Layout

Yū Station has one side platform (track 1) and one island platform (track 2,3). Both platforms are on ground and they are connected with an overpass. The station office with a Midori no Madoguchi ticket office is in front of the side platform.

See also
 List of railway stations in Japan

External links

  

Railway stations in Yamaguchi Prefecture
Sanyō Main Line
Railway stations in Japan opened in 1897